Marca is a genus of moths of the family Erebidae. The genus was erected by Max Saalmüller in 1891.

Species
Marca arcuata (Bethune-Baker, 1911)
Marca griseonigralis Viette, 1954
Marca proclinata Saalmüller, 1891
Marca tristalis Viette, 1956
Marca univocalis Viette, 1956

References

Saalmüller, M. & von Heyden, L. (1891). "Lepidopteren von Madagascar. Zweite Abtheilung. Heterocera: Noctuae, Geometrae, Microlepidoptera": 247–531, pls. 7–14.

Calpinae
Moth genera
Taxa named by Max Saalmüller